Andrea Carrie Drews (born December 25, 1993) is an American professional volleyball player for the United States women's national volleyball team. Drews was elected as the Most Valuable Player of the 2019 FIVB Women's Volleyball Nations League in Nanjing, China, where Team USA won the gold medal and the Best Opposite of the 2019 FIVB Volleyball Women's World Cup where the U.S. finished in second place. She won gold with the national team at the 2020 Tokyo Summer Olympics.

Personal life 
Annie Drews grew up in Elkhart, Indiana. Her parents are Mike Drews and Carrie Drews. She has a brother, Derek, who played basketball at Western Michigan University. She also has a sister, Erin, who is an artist.

When asked about her mindset on playing, she said, "My faith has been the biggest game changer/factor in my career, but more importantly, my life. I became a Christian in college and I truly believe that God has equipped me with opportunities and abilities to continue playing & learning in this sport."

At a young age, she started playing club volleyball for Mizuno Gold and Circle City Gold. In an interview, Drews revealed that she took part in competitive cheerleading when she was young.

Drews graduated from Purdue University with a degree in Hospitality and Tourism Management in 2015. On June 15, 2020, Drews and Tanner Schumacher announced their engagement. On September 6, 2021, Drews married Schumacher.

High school and collegiate years

Formative years and high school 
Drew started playing indoor club volleyball in 2008 with Network Juniors and concluded her youth club career with Northern Indiana Volleyball Academy. She was a two-time volleyball state champion at Penn High School in Mishawaka, Indiana, where she was selected an AVCA High School American as a senior.

Purdue University 
Drews began her sporting career in school tournaments. After emerging as one of the nation's top prep players at Penn High, she headed to Purdue University's women volleyball team, with which she took part in the NCAA Division I Championships from 2012 to 2015. "The monster of the Big Ten," Purdue coach Dave Shondell called Drews. She was an All-America outside hitter.

Drews received an honorable mention at the AVCA All-American in 2014. Moreover, Drews was selected AVCA Second-Team All-America in 2015 as a senior at Purdue University. She graduated from Purdue University in Hospitality and Tourism Management in 2015.

Career

Junior national team 
She was a member of the U.S. Women's National A2 Program (now known as U.S. Collegiate National Team) in 2013.

Club teams

2016: Indias de Mayagüez (PUR) 

In 2015, she began her professional career at 2016 Liga de Voleibol Superior Femenino where was finished runner-up with Indias de Mayagüez. She was named as part of the all-star team at the end of the tournament.

2017: Criollas de Caguas (PUR) 

In the following season, she played with Criollas de Caguas. Drews was named the league's MVP after leading Caquas Criollas to a 16–0 start and the Puerto Rican title. Her performance started catching the eye of Kiraly and SASB Volleyball Legano, the club in Italy's Serie A1 she eventually signed with.

2017-2018: SAB Volley Legnano & Pomi Casalmaggiore (ITA) 
In the 2017-18 championship she played in the Italian A1 Series in the newly promoted SAB Volley Legnano, ending her contract with the team in December 2017. In January 2018 she signed a contract with another Italian team, Casalmaggiore.

2018-2019: Kameroglu Beylikdüzü Voleybol Ihtisas (TUR) 

During the 2018-2019 pro season, she signed with Kameroglu Beylikdüzü Voleybol Ihtisas and played at the Turkish Volleyball League. She played the play-off quarterfinals and finished as the third-best scorer in the regular season with 384 points. She helped the club reach its best finish in the league since its inception.

2019-2020: JT Marvelous (JPN) 

In 2019, Drews took her scoring prowess to JT Marvelous to play in the Japan V.League Division 1 (V1), replacing Serbia women's national volleyball team outside hitter Brankica Mihajlovic. Due to prior commitments with the USA national team (participation in the 2019 Women's NORCECA Volleyball Continental Championship), she missed the first two games against Toyota Auto Body Queenseis (0-3) and Kurobe AquaFairies (3-2). In her first game with her team on October 19, she registered 32 points against Ageo Medics via 29 kills on 57 swings (50.9% hitting efficiency), 2 stuff blocks and 1 service ace. Against the previous year's runner-ups Toray Arrows (women's volleyball team), Drews hammered in 29 points on 23 of 55 attacking (41.82% hitting efficiency), 4 stuff blocks and 2 service aces to lead the Marvelous to its 3rd straight win. Against the PFU Bluecats on the 26th, Drews led the team in a straight sets victory with 15 kills on 34 swings (44.1% hitting efficiency), 1 stuff block and 1 service ace. Drews scored 29 points in their 5-set loss to Toray Arrows (women's volleyball team) on 2 November from 26 kills on 71 swings (36.6% hitting efficiency), 2 stuff blocks and 1 service ace. JT bounced back the following day after beating PFU Bluecats on November 3 behind Drews' 33 points - 29 kills on 49 swings (59.2% hitting efficiency) and 4 stuff blocks. On the 9th, JT edged out  Ageo Medics in a 4-set win with Drews scoring 26 points from 21 kills on 40 swings (52.5% hitting efficiency), 3 stuff blocks and 2 service aces. JT came up with a big win against then-spotless Toyota Auto Body Queenseis as Drews put up 21 kills on 47 swings (44.68% hitting efficiency), 2 stuff blocks and 3 service aces. On November 16, Drews contributed 9 points in a 3-set win against Kurobe AquaFairies with 8 kills on 18 swings (44.4% hitting efficiency) and 1 stuff block.

Exchange matches against the Premier Conference teams commenced on November 23. Drews notched 18 points all on kills from 43 swings (41.9% efficiency) in a losing effort against the NEC Red Rockets. JT bounced back the following day, 24 Nov, with a big 4-set win against the then-undefeated Denso Airybees. Drews had 24 kills on 47 swings (51.1% hitting efficiency), 3 stuff blocks and 4 service aces. JT regained their lead in the standings after clobbering Okayama Seagulls on November 30; Drews led all scorers with 25 kills on 41 swings (61.0% hitting efficiency), 1 stuff block and 2 service aces for 28 points. She then posted 18 points against Hisamitsu Springs - 17 kills on 29 swings (58.6% hitting efficiency) and 1 service ace - to lead JT Marvelous to a straight-sets win. Drews poured in 12 points in their 3-set victory against Hitachi Rivale with 9 kills on 27 swings (33.3% hitting efficiency), 2 stuff blocks and 1 service ace. The following day, Drews pounded 15 kills on 27 swings (55.6% hitting efficiency) to down Victorina Himeji via a sweep.

At the first match of the final round of conference play, Drews amassed a total of 20 points versus Toyota Auto Body Queenseis, 18 of which coming from kills of 30 swings (60.0% hitting efficiency) and 2 from stuff blocks. Drews continued loading the howitzer to lead her team in another 3-set win against PFU Bluecats on December 15. She tallied 23 points coming from 18 kills on 30 swings, 3 stuff blocks and 2 service aces. Drews dropped 37 points via 35 kills on 66 swings (53% hitting efficiency), 1 stuff block and 1 service ace in a loss to Ageo Medics on the 21st. JT Marvelous put up a dominant performance against Kurobe AquaFairies on December 22 backed by Drews' 15 points - 8 kills on 17 swings (47.1% hitting efficiency), 6 stuff blocks and 1 service ace. JT Marvelous ended the regular round strong by downing Toray Arrows (women's volleyball team) as Drews willed in 23 kills on 50 swings (46% hitting efficiency), 4 stuff blocks and 2 service aces. The win cemented JT Marvelous as the number 1 team in the Star Conference, finishing with a 17-4 W-L record, good for 49 points. As a reward, the team carried over 3 points to the Final 8 round which cushioned them over their opponents - Star No. 3, Premier No. 2 and Premier No. 4. Drews flexed stellar numbers - 382 kills on 778 swings (49.1% hitting efficiency) with 50 errors (0.427 hit clip), 41 stuff blocks and 24 services aces for a total of 447 points - good for second in scoring, despite missing the first two matches. Drews was also first in aces/set, second in hitting efficiency and eighth in blocks/set.

On January 12, 2020, JT Marvelous was awarded ¥1,500,000.00 and a trophy as regular round Champions of the Japan V.League Division 1 Star Conference. For her outstanding efficiency at the service line, Drews was awarded as the Regular Round Best Server. The Final 8 round started with a bang for Drews as she topped all scorers against Hisamitsu Springs - 18 kills on 37 swings (48.6% hitting efficiency), 2 stuff blocks and 2 service aces. Drews came up with 24 points - 23 kills on 43 swings (53.5% hitting efficiency) and a service ace - in the match against Toyota Auto Body Queenseis. JT proceeded to the semifinals after besting Premier no. 2 team Okayama Seagulls on the 19th. Drews accounted for 31 kills on 54 swings (57.4% hitting efficiency) and 2 service aces for 33 points.

In the semifinal match-up against Ageo Medics, Drews led all scorers with 23 points mounted on 21 kills on 39 swings and 2 service aces. The win granted JT Marvelous a ticket to the finals. In the final match against Okayama Seagulls, Drews led all scorers after tallying 36 points - 33 kills on 67 swings (49.3% hitting efficiency), 2 stuff blocks and 1 service ace. Eventually, JT Marvelous emerged as the Champions of the 2019-20 Japan V.League Division 1 (V1). Drews culminated her season run with a 509-60-1018 attacking rate (50% hitting efficiency, 0.440 clip), 45 stuff blocks (0.50 blocks/set) and 32 service aces (0.36 aces/set). For her impressive performance throughout the tournament, Drews was merited as the Best Opposite and Most Valuable Player.

2020-2021: JT Marvelous (JPN) 

V1. In March 2020, Drews was rumoured to play the 2020–2021 season in Brazil with the team Minas Tênis Clube. In April 2020, JT Marvelous renewed Drews' contract for the 2020-2021 Japan V.League Division 1 (V1) and is set to defend its title after outbidding Minas for Drews' contract. The decision to stay in Japan also came after USA head coach Karch Kiraly advised Drews to opt for the shorter and more organized league to give more time in preparation for Tokyo 2021. Drews arrived in Japan on September 22.

On October 17, 2020, JT Marvelous won their first match of the season in the finals rematch against Okayama Seagulls. Drews led all scorers in their straight-sets victory: 22-2-42 hitting (52.4% hitting efficiency) and 1 ace for 23 points. The following day, October 18, Drews poured in 27 points in their triumph over comebacking Miyu Nagaoka's Hisamitsu Springs: 26-1-50 hitting (52.0% hitting efficiency) and 1 ace. JT suffered their first loss at the hands of NEC Red Rockets in 4 sets as Drews recorded 27 points from 25-4-54 hitting (46.3% hitting efficiency), 1 block and 1 ace. Drews was used sparingly in their 31 October 2020 match against Hitachi Rivale. Drews scored 10 points in their win against Ageo Medics on November 1 from 9-0-18 hitting (50% hitting efficiency) and 1 block. On November 7, Drews powered JT to a 5-set victory against Denso Airybees via 19-4-46 hitting (41.3% hitting efficiency) and 3 blocks. The next day, Drews pounded in 26 points against Victorina Himeji: 25-3-46 hitting (53.2% hitting efficiency) and 1 block. The following week, JT emerged against Kurobe AquaFairies behind Drews' 22 points: 21-4-44 hitting (47.7% hitting efficiency) and 1 block. 21 November 2020 saw Drews and JT overpowering PFU Bluecats in straight sets as Drews scored 12 points from 10-1-18 hitting (55.6% hitting efficiency), 1 block and 1 ace. On November 28, Drews showed might after scoring 16 points following 14-0-23 hitting (60.9% hitting efficiency), 1 block and 1 ace against Toyota Auto Body Queenseis. For their last match of the first leg, JT Marvelous fought a highly contested bout against league-leading Toray Arrows. Drews' 21 points from 20-1-46 hitting (43.5% hitting efficiency) and 1 block weren't enough to land JT to 1st at the end of the first round.

JT finished off Foluke Akinradewo and Hisamitsu Springs in straight sets to open their 2nd leg campaign in the league led by Drews' 24 points: 23-2-42 hitting (54.8% hitting efficiency) and 1 ace. The following day, JT obliterated Okayama Seagulls after Drews scored 21 points, all from 21-0-41 hitting (51.2% hitting efficiency). The match signified the last league game of the year.

At the end of the double round-robin regular round, Drews ranked 1st in points per set, 1st in back row attack rate, 2nd in scoring and 2nd in overall attack rate.

Drews scored 42 points as she led 2nd-ranked JT to a 5-set semifinal playoff win against NEC Red Rockets via a 5-set win on February 20, 2021. The following day, JT showed its mastery over Toray in high-stakes matches as they clinched their 3rd title in league history after beating them in 4 sets. Drews was named Best Opposite of the tournament as she scored 25 points in the finals. 

Empress Cup. JT participated in the 2020 edition of the Empress Cup. On December 12, Drews led all scorers to beat NEC Red Rockets in the quarterfinals. The following day, Drews scored 40 points on 36-2-71 attacking (50.7% hitting efficiency) and 4 blocks in their semifinals victory against Denso Airybees. On December 19, Drews and JT Marvelous won their first Empress Cup after emerging against Toray Arrows in a 3-set sweep. Drews amassed 32 points from 30-1-46 attacking (65.2% hitting efficiency), 1 block and 1 ace. Drews was hailed as the Most Valuable Player of the cup.

2021-2022: JT Marvelous (JPN) 
V1. Drews renewed with Japanese Team JT Marvelous for the third straight season and was set to play for the 2021-2022 Japan V.League Division 1 (V1). By the end of eliminations, Drews lead JT as the Season Champions of the 2021-22 V.League Division 1 Women with a 27–6 win-loss record. At the final stage, JT Marvelous lost the first match of the gold medal match to Hisamitsu Springs. Due to COVID cases in both teams, the second game was cancelled, thereby making Hisamitsu the eventual champions and JT runners-up. Drews announced in April 2022 that she will be leaving JT Marvelous after steering the team to its most historic run in the league.

Senior national team

2017

2017 Women's Pan-American Volleyball Cup
Drews entered the USA senior national volleyball team for the first time in 2017, having been handpicked by Karch Kiraly, widely regarded as one of the best coaches in professional volleyball, who returned as the head coach of the team that year after Rio Olympic Games in 2016. Kiraly brought Drews into Team USA's summer-long camp in Anaheim, California. When Drews joined the team, she was already behind many of the players who had been in the Team USA gym since May 1 as the Puerto Rican league playoffs went through mid-May. Drews debuted for the United States national team later that year. Used primarily as the opposite in the double-sub with just two match starts, Drews led Team USA in scoring in three (against Columbia, Mexico and Argentina) of its first five matches in its gold medal run at the 2017 Women's Pan-American Volleyball Cup in June.

2017 USA Volleyball Cup 

Drews led Team USA past fourth-ranked Brazil with a 21-point performance to open the 2017 USA Volleyball Cup in Anaheim on a Sunday evening. Drews powered down 16 kills on 38 swings against Brazil while adding four blocks and an ace over the course of the four sets, with final set a bonus set after the Americans won the first three sets 25–21, 25–14, 29–27. However, in the official three sets of the match, Drews was her most dominant having 14 kills on 26 attacks with just three errors to go with three blocks and an ace. And she was able to have such a break-out match on American soil with her family in the stands watching."I think it has been awesome," Drews said immediately after the Brazil match. "The longer I get into my career, the more moments like this will stand out when we do get to play on American soil and have our families here. USA has been awesome about having our families able to come to practice and they are here tonight."

2017 FIVB Volleyball World Grand Prix
Kiraly left Drews in Anaheim for the first rounds of the 2017 FIVB Volleyball World Grand Prix. Drews took advantage of being one of only two opposites in the two- and three-hour sessions in the gym back in Orange County."When you only have two (opposites), you're getting a ton, a ton of touches," Drews said. "There are some benefits to being in the home group when the team is traveling because you get so many reps. I think being so new to this system I really wanted to take advantage of those reps and see if I could get a lot better."The extra work paid off with a spot on the U.S. roster for the 2017 FIVB Volleyball World Grand Prix finals round. Although the U.S. did not win either of its Finals Round matches against Serbia and Italy, Drews came off the bench in both contests to provide a huge spark. Drews was the U.S.' top scorer (16 points: 15 kills in 39 swings for a 38.46% hitting efficiency; and 1 ace) in a 3–1 loss to Italy. She racked up with 10 points (10/26 for a 38.46% hitting efficiency) in USA's faltered comeback attempt from being down 2 sets to none against Serbia. USA finished 5th at the final staging of the World Grand Prix, tied with Netherlands.

2017 FIVB Volleyball Women's World Grand Champions Cup
Drews returned for duty as she joined the U.S. team for the 2017 FIVB Volleyball Women's World Grand Champions Cup. She started at opposite for all matches and top-scored in 2 occasions - 22 points vs. Japan and 12 points vs. Brazil. In its win over Korea, 25–22, 25–20, 25–16, Drews contributed 11 points on eight kills, two blocks and an ace. She helped USA claim the bronze medal for the tournament.

2018

2018 FIVB Volleyball Women's Nations League 
In 2018, Drews joined the U.S. team in the inaugural 2018 FIVB Volleyball Women's Nations League where they eventually won gold against Turkey (25-17, 22–25, 28–26, 15–25, 7–15).

2019

2019 FIVB Volleyball Women's Nations League

Drews returned for another round of duty for the U.S. team in the 2019 FIVB Volleyball Women's Nations League. During the preliminary rounds, she led the Best Attackers race with a 205-68-426 attacking card, good for 48.12% hitting efficiency. After advancing to the final round, Drews once again ranked first in the Best Attackers chart with a 69-18-132 attacking card, good for 52.27 hitting efficiency. She was the 2nd Best Scorer with 69 attacks, 4 blocks and 4 aces for 77 points, behind top scorer Liu Yanhan's (China) 79 points.

Annie Drews led Team USA with 23 points, including 21 kills on 41 attacks, one block and one ace against Poland in the finals pool play. Drews did not see action in the pool play match against Brazil to give way for Jordan Thompson. Drews scored 21 points in the semifinals against China to lead Team USA to victory. Drews had 16 kills on 31 swings, three aces and two blocks.

In the Gold Medal Match, Drews was named Most Valuable Player after leading USA to victory, including a team-high 33 points against Brazil in the title match. Drews hit 32/59 and added one block. The comeback concluded in high drama in the fifth set with an unusual ending. Although Brazil earned the first two-point cushion of the tiebreaking fifth set at 3–1, Team USA bounced back to take its first lead of the set at 5–4 with two Robinson kills after a Brazil service error. The Americans extended the advantage to three at 8–5 with a Drews kill, Robinson ace and Larson kill. Brazil closed to one at 10–9. Team USA went up 13–10 with kills from Drews and Haleigh Washington. Brazil saved two match points at 14–13. In a bold move, Coach Karch Kiraly called for a video challenge for net touch during the middle of match point and Team USA won the points as the video clearly showed Brazil touching the net antenna. After the win, Kiraly did not spare kind words for the tournament MVP Andrea Drews after the match"Wow, Annie. I don't know how many points she had, but she was huge. Everyone was huge. What a great team win, fall down 2-0 against one of the greatest teams in the world, Brazil. Jordan Larson came in and gave us a great lift, Tori Dixon also. It was a total team win, 14-person plus here, all the other people in our program including the 14 battling in Peru. Total team effort. So much to be proud of. We got better as the match went along. We improved our blocking lineups, had a nice passing lineup in there. Lauren Carlini doing a really nice job of running our offense and distributing."

2019 FIVB Women's Volleyball Intercontinental Olympic Qualification Tournament 
On 2–4 August, Drews competed with USA in the 2019 FIVB Women's Volleyball Intercontinental Olympic Qualifications Tournament (IOQT) in CenturyLink Center, Shreveport-Bossier City, United States. After matches against Kazakhstan (3-0), Bulgaria (3-2) and Argentina (3-0), USA qualified for the Tokyo Olympic Games in 2020. As a result of their second-place finish in the 2019 FIVB Volleyball Women's World Cup, USA's FIVB World Rankings points led them to become the 2nd best team in the world as of October 2019. This put them at Pool B during the Olympic Games in 2020.

2019 FIVB Volleyball Women's World Cup

Drews was lined-up for another round of NT duties at the 2019 FIVB Volleyball Women's World Cup in Japan from September 14–29.  Drews started at opposite for most of the time but also shared lineups with Karsta Lowe. In their first match against Kenya, Drews hit 12 attacks on 22 swings (54.45% hitting efficiency) and added 2 aces to top-score at 14 points. Drews hit 10 attacks on 23 swings (43.47% hitting efficiency), had a stuff block and an ace in their 3–0 win against the Netherlands. USA bagged another impressive straight sets victory against Brazil with Drews having 12 attacks on 27 swings (44.44% hitting efficiency) and 2 stuff blocks for 14 points. In their 3-set loss against eventual gold medalists China, Drews, used sparingly, contributed 6 kills on 12 swings (50% hitting efficiency). In their bounce-back win against Dominican Republic, Drews posted an impressive 23 points in 3 sets mounted from 18 attacks on 29 swings (62.07% hitting efficiency), 3 stuff blocks and 2 aces. USA gutted out a 5-set outing against Russia anchored on Drew's 20 attacks on 46 swings (43.48% hitting efficiency), 1 stuff block and 1 ace.

In their final match of the tournament vs. South Korea, Drews gave out an impressive 20 attacks on 41 swings (48.78% hitting efficiency), 2 stuff blocks and 2 aces for 24 points. South Korea women's national volleyball team head coach, Stefano Lavarini, gave praise to Drews' performance in the post-match interview saying:"We couldn't put pressure on their service and the United States in the first two sets, but especially the second, played really strong and their attackers were almost unstoppable, most especially their incredible opposite Andrew Drews. You got Boskovic and Egonu and now I think she's the one to watch."Drews was the league's 17th Best Scorer (105 attacks, 9 blocks, and 9 aces) and 3rd Best Attacker (105-29-225 for a 46.67% hitting efficiency). Her performance merited the team and her a silver medal finish and a Best Opposite award.

2019 Women's NORCECA Volleyball Championship 
For the final round of 2019 national team duty, Drews was lined-up for the 2019 Women's NORCECA Volleyball Continental Championship held in San Juan, Puerto Rico from 8–13 October. Drews was inserted as a starter during the second and third set of their pool play match against Mexico. USA eventually won the match in straight sets as she added eight kills on 14 swings and a block for nine points. During the finals, Drews came in as a substitute on the second set for teammate Karsta Lowe in the opposite position. She totalled 12 kills on 33 attacks (35.94% hitting efficiency) and chipped in 6 digs. USA eventually settled for silver for the tournament.

2019 USA Volleyball Awards

After a breakout year with the USA WNVT, Drews was selected as the 2019 USA Volleyball Female Indoor Player of the Year. She sparked the U.S. Women's National Team to three tournament podium finishes (one gold, two silvers) in events she competed during 2019, all while being selected to two FIVB tournament dream teams. Drews tallied a Team USA-high 388 points in 2019 with a 4.56 scoring average per set, second most among players with at least one start. For the season, Drews started 23 matches and played in 85 sets compiling 3.94 kills, 0.35 blocks and 0.27 aces per set. She converted 46.3 percent of her attacks into points with a .317 hitting efficiency. Her defense improved throughout 2019 with 107 digs for a 1.26 dig average."I am beyond grateful to represent USA Volleyball and for all of the opportunities I got to experience in 2019 with our team," Drews said. "We have so many talented players and impactful women in our program and I'm just honored to continue to learn and grow alongside some of the best. Thank you to our team and staff for all of the work put in to make 2019 a successful year for USA Volleyball."Drews claimed the most valuable player honor at the 2019 FIVB Volleyball Nations League and was selected as Best Opposite on the 2019 FIVB World Cup Dream Team. She averaged 4.70 points per set during the VNL, starting 12 of the 19 matches. She held a .315 hitting efficiency while converting 47.6 percent of her attacks into points. She averaged 4.08 kills, 0.34 blocks and 0.28 aces per set during the VNL. Drews started nine of the 11 World Cup matches and converted 45.3 percent of her attacks into points with a .324 hitting efficiency. She averaged 3.92 kills, 0.38 blocks and 0.31 aces per set for a 4.62 scoring average.

2021

2021 FIVB Volleyball Women's Nations League 
In May 2021, she was named to the 18-player roster for the 2021 FIVB Volleyball Women's Nations League tournament that was played in Rimini, Italy. It was the only major international competition before the Tokyo Olympics in July. She was one of two opposites selected for the tournament alongside Jordan Thompson. Her debut match against Canada saw her scoring 20 points (19-4-37 att, 51.4% hitting efficiency; 1 ace) to lead the US in a straight-sets victory. Against Brazil, Drews scored 16 points (15-7-37 att, 40.5% hitting efficiency; 1 ace) in their four-set win. Drews scored 11 points (9-4-25 att, 36% hitting efficiency; 2 blks) in their victory against the Netherlands. USA again routed Germany in straight sets following Drews' 17 points (17-0-26 att, 65.4% hitting efficiency). USA capped their third round of VNL action beating Italy, three sets to one, led by Drews' 20 points (18-3-30 att, 60% hitting efficiency; 2 aces).

2020 Summer Olympic Games in Tokyo 
On June 7, 2021, US National Team head coach Karch Kiraly announced she would be part of the 12-player Olympic roster for the 2020 Summer Olympics in Tokyo. Drews was initially slotted as for an off-the-bench role but assumed starting opposite duties when Jordan Thompson went down with an ankle injury. She started in the pool play match against Italy, leading the United States to a 5-set victory. After landing at the top of their pool, the United States went unbeaten in the medal rounds, winning all their matches without dropping a single set. Drews top scored for the team in all four matches, leading the United States Women's Volleyball Team to its inaugural gold medal at the indoor volleyball event in Tokyo.

2022

2022 FIVB Volleyball Women's Nations League 
In May 2022, Drews made her return to the national team after winning the gold medal at the Tokyo Olympics for the 2022 FIVB Volleyball Women's Nations League. Drews helped the team clinch a 3–1 record in the first week, top scoring for the games she started.

Clubs 

  Indias de Mayagüez (2016)
  Criollas de Caguas (2017)
  SAB Volley Legnano (2017–2018)
  Pomi Casalmaggiore (2018)
  Kameroglu Beylikdüzü Voleybol Ihtisas (2018–2019)
  JT Marvelous (2019–2022)
  Megabox Ondulati Del Savio Vallefoglia (2023–)

Awards and honors

United States national team

2017  Women's Pan-American Volleyball Cup
2017  USA Volleyball Cup
2017  FIVB Volleyball Women's World Grand Champions Cup 
2018  FIVB Volleyball Women's Nations League
2019  FIVB Volleyball Women's Nations League
2019  FIVB Women's Volleyball Intercontinental Olympic Qualifications Tournament (IOQT) - Qualified
2019  FIVB Women's World Cup
2019  Women's NORCECA Volleyball Continental Championship
2021  FIVB Volleyball Women's Nations League
2021  2020 Summer Olympics
2022  USA Volleyball Cup

Individuals

2012 BIG 10 All-Freshman Team
2014 Honorable Mention AVCA All-American 
2015 AVCA Second-Team All-American 
2016 Liga de Voleibol Superior Femenino - "Best Opposite"
2017 Liga de Voleibol Superior Femenino - "Best Opposite"
2017 Liga de Voleibol Superior Femenino - "Most Valuable Player"
2019 FIVB Women's Volleyball Nations League – "Best Attacker"
2019 FIVB Women's Volleyball Nations League – "Most Valuable Player"
2019 FIVB Women's World Cup – "Best Opposite"
2019 USA Volleyball - "Female Indoor Player of the Year"
2019-2020 Japan Division 1 V.League (V1) - "Best Server"
2019-2020 Japan Division 1 V.League (V1) - "Best Opposite"
2019-2020 Japan Division 1 V.League (V1) - "Most Valuable Player"
2020 Empress's Cup All Japan Volleyball Championship - "Most Valuable Player"
2020-2021 Japan Division 1 V.League (V1) - "Best Opposite"
2021-2022 Japan Division 1 V.League (V1) - "Best Opposite"
2021-2022 Japan Division 1 V.League (V1) - "Fighting Spirit Award"

Clubs

National championships 

Liga de Voleibol Superior Femenino
2015-2016  runner-up, with Indias de Mayagüez
2016-2017  Champion, with Criollas de Caguaso
Japan Division 1 V.League (V1) 
2019-2020  Star Conference Champion, with JT Marvelous
2019-2020  Final Stage Champion, with JT Marvelous
2020-2021  Final Stage Champion, with JT Marvelous
2021-2022  Season Champion, with JT Marvelous
2021-2022  Final Stage runner-up, with JT Marvelous
Empress's Cup All Japan Volleyball Championship
2020  Champion, with JT Marvelous
2021  runner-up, with JT Marvelous

Notable recognitions 
On April 7, 2020, Fédération Internationale de Volleyball recognized Drews as the FIVB Player of the Week following a series of features of the world's elite volleyball players. She followed week 1 awardee Yuji Nishida.

References 

Living people
1993 births
American women's volleyball players
Purdue Boilermakers women's volleyball players
Opposite hitters
Expatriate volleyball players in Italy
American expatriate sportspeople in Italy
American expatriate sportspeople in Japan
Expatriate volleyball players in Japan
Volleyball players at the 2020 Summer Olympics
Olympic gold medalists for the United States in volleyball
Medalists at the 2020 Summer Olympics
People from Elkhart, Indiana
Sportspeople from Muncie, Indiana
Volleyball players from Indiana
Christians from Indiana
Expatriate volleyball players in Turkey